Buddy in Africa is an American animated short film, released by Warner Bros. on July 6, 1935 (though one source gives July 6, 1935 as a date). It is a Looney Tunes cartoon, featuring Buddy, the second star of the series. Ben Hardaway supervised the short; musical direction was by Norman Spencer. Notably, Jack Carr, who provided Buddy's voice, is a credited animator on this cartoon. The short Buddy in Africa was first shown at the Whittier Theatre in Whittier, California on its release day.

Summary
The film opens to Africa, where the native people do a series of strange things. One mows the grass forming the roof of his hut; another twists the bone in his companion's hair, then his mouth clamps down on and crushes a native fruit; still another throws his companions in sport, as though they were horseshoes. A gorilla attempts to hail an approaching car, driven by none other than Buddy, who does not stop, but rides on, with his trailer marked "Buddy's Variety Store," whilst whistling "Marchin' Towards Ya, Georgia." He rolls on into a native village, where the excited people quickly gather round. The trailer opens, the Africans take what wares they desire from the shelves, with Buddy's obliging help. In this way, So musical instruments, frying pans, and Roman candles get distributed.

The scene briefly flashes to the same gorilla from before, then back to the natives, who fool around with their Roman candles. Buddy now markets his famous jungle bitters to the people, the consumption of which compels the natives to perform a musical number ("Marchin' Towards Ya Georgia," again.) Our Hero then pursues a naughty monkey that has taken a bottle of Buddy's bitters. After searching around and under his car, Buddy finally apprehends the wayward primate, takes the bottle, and spanks the creature.

Running off into the jungle, the monkey encounters the hitch-hiker gorilla from before, and tells of its abuse by Buddy. Walking proudly, the gorilla and the monkey enter the village after pummeling the native guarding the gate. The gorilla approaches Buddy as he inflates a tire; Buddy obviously fears the beast. After a brief scuffle near the tire and air pump, Buddy flees to a nearby guard tower, to which the gorilla chases him, with the tire and pump as a flail. The tire, upon being flung, bounces back, striking the gorilla and knocking the adversary into a tree.  The tree bends backward under the gorilla's weight and sends the creature flying into the guard tower. The tower breaks, trapping Buddy and his rival under the rubble. The little monkey comes over to squawk in complaint. In response, the gorilla strikes the tire from before, which is still attached to the air pump. The pump's lever extends such and sends the monkey flying far into the distance. Buddy and the beast shake hands in a sort of triumph.

That's All Folks!
This is the second Buddy cartoon after which Beans the Cat delivers the traditional Looney Tunes valediction, "that's all, folks!" For more on this, see the relevant section of the article on Buddy's Bug Hunt.

References

External links
 
 

1935 films
1935 animated films
1930s American animated films
1930s animated short films
American black-and-white films
Films scored by Norman Spencer (composer)
Animated films about gorillas
Films directed by Ben Hardaway
Buddy (Looney Tunes) films
Films set in Africa
Looney Tunes shorts
Warner Bros. Cartoons animated short films